McNeir is a surname. Notable people with the surname include:

 Clive Leo McNeir, British linguist and lexicographer
 Forest McNeir (1875–1957), American sharpshooter and Olympian
 Ronnie McNeir (born 1949), American singer and songwriter
 William McNeir, member of Today (band)

See also
 McNair
 McNeil (surname)